The Drew Pearson Show was an American television program originally broadcast on ABC and later on the now defunct DuMont Television Network. The series ran from 1952 to 1953. It was a public affairs program hosted by political columnist Drew Pearson.

The program aired Sunday nights at 11 (Eastern Standard Time) on ABC. When the series moved to the DuMont network, it aired on Wednesday nights at 7:30. The series was cancelled in mid-March 1953.

See also
List of programs broadcast by the DuMont Television Network
List of surviving DuMont Television Network broadcasts

References

Bibliography
David Weinstein, The Forgotten Network: DuMont and the Birth of American Television (Philadelphia: Temple University Press, 2004) 
Alex McNeil, Total Television, Fourth edition (New York: Penguin Books, 1980) 
Tim Brooks and Earle Marsh, The Complete Directory to Prime Time Network TV Shows, Third edition (New York: Ballantine Books, 1964)

External links

DuMont historical website

DuMont Television Network original programming
American Broadcasting Company original programming
Black-and-white American television shows
English-language television shows
1952 American television series debuts
1953 American television series endings
Lost television shows